Kiran Ashar (19 June 1947 – 27 May 2017) was an Indian cricketer. He played seven first-class matches for Mumbai between 1968 and 1978.

References

External links
 

1947 births
2017 deaths
Indian cricketers
Mumbai cricketers
Cricketers from Mumbai
Wicket-keepers